The North St. Vrain Creek Bridge, in Lyons, Colorado, was built in 1955.  It was listed on the National Register of Historic Places in 2002.

It brings State Highway 7, at its milepost 32.98, over the North St. Vrain Creek. It is a single-span road bridge designed by the U.S. Bureau of Public Roads and built in 1955 by Lowdermilk Brothers contractors. It is a concrete rigid frame bridge.

It is located on the southern side of Lyons.

See also
National Register of Historic Places listings in Boulder County, Colorado

References

		
National Register of Historic Places in Boulder County, Colorado
Bridges on the National Register of Historic Places in Colorado